is a Japanese footballer who currently plays for Kamatamare Sanuki.

Career statistics

Club

Notes

References

External links

1996 births
Living people
Japanese footballers
Association football midfielders
J3 League players
Kamatamare Sanuki players
Association football people from Kagoshima Prefecture